Moody Point is a point which forms the east end of Joinville Island, off the northeast end of the Antarctic Peninsula. It was discovered by a British expedition under James Clark Ross, 1839–43, and named by him for Richard Moody, lieutenant governor of the Falkland Islands.

See also
Williwaw Rocks

References

Headlands of the Joinville Island group